Comfort Bight is a former settlement in Newfoundland and Labrador.

The fish producer and merchant, J.W. Hiscock Sons of Brigus, was founded here in 1894.

References

Ghost towns in Newfoundland and Labrador